The 1935 Liverpool West Derby by-election was held on 6 July 1935.  The by-election was held due to the death of the incumbent Conservative MP, John Sandeman Allen.  It was won by the Conservative candidate David Maxwell Fyfe.

References

1935 elections in the United Kingdom
1935 in England
1930s in Liverpool
West Derby, 1935
Unopposed by-elections to the Parliament of the United Kingdom (need citation)
July 1935 events